George Ignacio Mira (born January 11, 1942) is a Cuban-American former professional American football player, a  quarterback in eight National Football League (NFL) seasons for four teams. He then played five seasons in the Canadian Football League (CFL) and World Football League (WFL).

Early years
Born and raised in Key West, Florida, Mira graduated from Key West High School in 1960. He played college football at the University of Miami under head coach Andy Gustafson.

One of the best games in Mira's collegiate career came as a junior in 1962 in the Gotham Bowl against the Nebraska Cornhuskers.  Despite playing in  weather in front of fewer than a thousand fans at Yankee Stadium, Mira threw for 321 yards, a Miami school record at the time, and was named the bowl game's most valuable player. Despite Mira's efforts, the Cornhuskers won by two points, 36–34. The previous year, the Hurricanes lost by a point to Syracuse in the Liberty Bowl.

At the start of the 1963 season Mira was the cover story for Sports Illustrated's college preview issue.  The article, written by Key West native John Underwood, was titled "One Wonderful Conch is this Mira" and featured many anecdotes about Mira's life growing up and becoming a star on the small island.

Playing career
Mira was selected in the second round of the 1964 NFL draft, fifteenth overall, by the San Francisco 49ers. Primarily a reserve, he played for eight NFL seasons, 1964 through 1971, for the 49ers, Philadelphia Eagles, Baltimore Colts, and Miami Dolphins.  He was a backup to John Brodie in San Francisco and to Bob Griese in Super Bowl VI as a member of the 1971 Dolphins. With the 49ers in 1964, he threw a pass to quarterback Billy Kilmer (who was playing running back) that Kilmer eventually fumbled; the fumble would be recovered by Minnesota Vikings defensive end Jim Marshall, who infamously ran 66 yards in the wrong direction.

Mira signed a multi-year contract with the Montreal Alouettes of the Canadian Football League (CFL) in August 1972, completing 92 of 168 passes for 1356 yards and 11 touchdowns and eight interceptions in 1973.

With the Birmingham Americans of the new World Football League (WFL) in 1974, he was MVP of their championship game victory, completing 155 of 313 passes for 2,248 yards and 17 touchdowns and 14 interceptions during the season. Despite the success on the field, the Birmingham franchise folded in March. In 1975, with the Jacksonville Express of the WFL, he completed 123 of 254 passes for 1,675 yards and 12 touchdowns and interceptions. The league would cease operations late in the 1975 season.

Mira finished his career in 1977, playing six games for the Toronto Argonauts as a player-coach.

After football
Mira returned to Florida and now operates the Native Conch, a food concession at Fairchild Botanical Gardens in Coral Gables.   For many years he owned a Key West restaurant called George Mira's Pizza Huddle, located across the street from the junior league baseball fields where it became a haven for post-game celebrations.

Personal
His son George Mira Jr. was an All-American linebacker at the University of Miami.

See also

 List of NCAA major college football yearly passing leaders
 List of NCAA major college football yearly total offense leaders

References

External links
 
WFL players – George Mira
CFLapedia – George Mira

1942 births
Living people
American people of Basque descent
People from Key West, Florida
Players of American football from Florida
American football quarterbacks
Miami Hurricanes football players
San Francisco 49ers players
Philadelphia Eagles players
Miami Dolphins players
Birmingham Americans players
Jacksonville Express players
American players of Canadian football
Canadian football quarterbacks
Montreal Alouettes players
Toronto Argonauts players